Jesús Eugenio Rodríguez Garzon (born June 30, 1967) is a retired male wrestler from Cuba, who competed in the freestyle competition during his career. He won a bronze medal at the 1995 Pan American Games for his native country, and competed at the 1992 Summer Olympics in Barcelona, Spain. There he was eliminated in the first round after losses to Israel's Max Geller and Japan's eventual bronze medalist Kosei Akaishi.

Achievements
1990 Central American Championship: 68.0 kg Freestyle (1st)
1990 World Championship: 68.0 kg Freestyle (3rd)
1991 Pan American Games: 68.0 kg Freestyle (4th)
1994 World Championship: 68.0 kg Freestyle (2nd)
1995 Pan American Games: 68.0 kg Freestyle (3rd)
1995 World Championship: 68.0 kg Freestyle (3rd)

References
sports-reference.com

1967 births
Living people
Olympic wrestlers of Cuba
Wrestlers at the 1992 Summer Olympics
Cuban male sport wrestlers
Pan American Games bronze medalists for Cuba
Pan American Games medalists in wrestling
Wrestlers at the 1995 Pan American Games
Medalists at the 1995 Pan American Games